Secret People is the fifth studio album by folk rock band Capercaillie. It reached number 40 in the UK album charts.  It was re-released in North America by Valley Entertainment in 2003.

Track listing
 "Bonaparte" (Trad. Arr. Capercaillie) – 4:43
 "Grace and Pride" (Manus Lunny) – 5:12
 "Tobar Mhoire (Tobermory)" (Trad. Arr. Capercaillie) – 3:48
 "Four Stone Walls" (John Saich) – 3:16
 "Crime of Passion" (Donald Shaw) – 4:58
 "The Whinney Hills Jigs" (Trad. Arr. Capercaillie) – 6:10
 "An Eala Bhàn (The White Swan)" (Trad. Arr. Capercaillie) – 5:30
 "Seice Ruairidh (Roddy's Drum)" (Trad. Arr. Capercaillie) – 4:24
 "Stinging Rain" (M. Lunny) – 4:50
 "Hi Rim Bo" (Trad. Arr. Capercaillie) – 3:34
 "The Miracle of Being" (Shaw) – 6:12
 "The Harley Ashtray" (Charlie McKerron/Marc Duff) – 4:06
 "Oran" (Words: Aonghas MacNeacail Music: Shaw) – 2:24
 "Black Fields" (John Saich) – 4:33

Credits
Karen Matheson - vocals
Charlie McKerron - Fiddle
John Saich - Bass, Guitar, Backing vocals, Synthbass on track 1
Manus Lunny - Bouzouki, Guitar, Backing vocals, Vocals on tracks 2 and 9
Marc Duff - Whistles, Bodhran, Wind Synth
Donald Shaw - Accordion, Keyboards, Backing vocals
James Mackintosh - drums and percussion except for track 11
Ian Murray - Drums on track 11, additional percussion
Donal Lunny - Bodhran on track 12

External links
 Information about the album on Capercaillie's official website

References 

Capercaillie (band) albums
1993 albums
Scottish Gaelic music